"Rhythm of Love" is a song by American rock band Plain White T's. It is the first single from their sixth studio album Wonders of the Younger. The song debuted at number 96 on the Billboard Hot 100 and peaked at number 38. The song was featured in a fall 2010 promo for the season two premiere of Parenthood on NBC, and also during the closing credits of the 2011 film No Strings Attached.
As of April 2011, the single has sold over 1,000,000 copies.

Background
"Rhythm of Love" is written by Tim Lopez. On the band's previous disc, Lopez shared vocals with Higgenson on two tracks, but this marks his first time doing a solo lead vocal. The band described the song which has a markedly gentle feel—gentler than "Hey There Delilah" which was the first drumless tune to hit No. 1 on the Billboard Hot 100 in years. "It's a distinct style change than what we've done in the past," says Lopez, and not just because of his temporary frontman status on it. "Just with that island-y scratch guitar – it's the sound I heard in my head when it came to writing a song." The song is played by gently lilting acoustic guitars.

Music video
The music video was directed by Mike Venezia  who also helmed the band's previous hit video for "1,2,3,4".  Premiering August 14, 2010 on VH1,  it was subsequently voted to the VH1 Top 20 Countdown fourteen weeks in a row, peaking at #6.  The music video was also ranked one of the top seven clips of the year by tween magazine J-14,  and accrued over 8 million hits on YouTube.

Filmed at Point Mugu, California,  the video follows singer Tim Lopez as he walks and sings his way through a beach party along the edge of the shore.  Band performance also occurs in front of a circus themed red and white striped wall, surrounded by dancers. The wall was later recreated as an illustration for the album cover of Wonders of the Younger,  and physically re-constructed as a backdrop for official live tour performances.

On January 22, 2011, the "Rhythm of Love" music video was re-released in 3D by PassmoreLab and added to the official Mitsubishi 3D reel in over 11,000 retail locations, and made available for distribution worldwide.

Chart performance
"Rhythm of Love" debuted at number 96 on the Billboard Hot 100 on the week of August 28, 2010 before falling off the next week. It re-charted at number 99 on the week of September 28, 2010 before falling off again two weeks later. On the week of October 23, 2010, the song re-charted again at number 89 and continually climbed up until the week of February 19, 2011 where it made its final appearance by peaking at number 38, their third Top 40 hit on that chart to date.

Weekly charts

Year-end charts

Certification

References

2010 singles
Plain White T's songs
Hollywood Records singles
2010 songs